Amphiops is a genus of aquatic beetles in the tribe Amphiopini of the family Hydrophilidae, first described by Wilhelm Ferdinand Erichson in 1843.

They occur only in Africa, Asia and Australia. In Australia they are found in the Northern Territory, Western Australia and Queensland, in wet tropical areas.

Species 
(source GBIF)
Amphiops australicus 
Amphiops austrinus 
Amphiops caristripus 
Amphiops coelopunctatus 
Amphiops confusus 
Amphiops coomani 
Amphiops duplopunctatus 
Amphiops gibbus 
Amphiops globus 
Amphiops lasioides 
Amphiops mater 
Amphiops micropunctatus 
Amphiops mirabilis 
Amphiops namibicus 
Amphiops phallicus 
Amphiops queenslandicus 
Amphiops senegalensis 
Amphiops simplex 
Amphiops uhligi 
Amphiops wittei

References

Hydrophilinae